Point Edward (2001 pop.: 396) is a community in Nova Scotia's Cape Breton Regional Municipality.

It is located on the southwest shore of the North West Arm of Sydney Harbour, immediately north of the community of North West Arm, south of Edwardsville and west of Westmount.

Point Edward is also the name of a headland extending into Sydney Harbour, bifurcating it into the North West Arm and the South Arm. This tip of this headland is located in Edwardsville.

References
Point Edward on Destination Nova Scotia

General Service Areas in Nova Scotia
Communities in the Cape Breton Regional Municipality